Colvale or Colovale is a census town in North Goa district in the state of Goa, India.

Demographics
 India census, Colvale had a population of 5475. Males constitute 55% of the population and females 45%. Colvale has an average literacy rate of 72%, higher than the national average of 59.5%: male literacy is 74% and, female literacy is 69%. In Colvale, 10% of the population is under 6 years of age.

Industrial estate
Currently, Colvale is home to a Government of Goa-run industrial estate. There are, as of 2021, some 25 units in production at the Colvale industrial estate.

Notable people
Antu Shenoy the forefather of Abbe Faria, Goan hypnotist
Wendell Rodricks (19560 - 2020) Indian designer and author of Moda Goa and The Green Room.

References

Cities and towns in North Goa district